In probability theory, Dudley's theorem is a result relating the expected upper bound and regularity properties of a Gaussian process to its entropy and covariance structure.

History
The result was first stated and proved by V. N. Sudakov, as pointed out in a paper by Dudley, "V. N. Sudakov's work on expected suprema of Gaussian processes," in High Dimensional Probability VII,  Eds. C. Houdré, D. M. Mason, P. Reynaud-Bouret, and Jan Rosiński, Birkhăuser, Springer, Progress in Probability 71, 2016, pp. 37–43.  Dudley had earlier credited Volker Strassen with making the connection between entropy and regularity.

Statement
Let (Xt)t∈T be a Gaussian process and let dX be the pseudometric on T defined by

For ε > 0, denote by N(T, dX; ε) the entropy number, i.e. the minimal number of (open) dX-balls of radius ε required to cover T.  Then

Furthermore, if the entropy integral on the right-hand side converges, then X has a version with almost all sample path bounded and (uniformly) continuous on (T, dX).

References

 
  (See chapter 11)

Entropy
Theorems regarding stochastic processes